Oscar Lisandro Sacripanti (born 7 January 1982) is a retired Argentine football forward.

In his extensive career Sacripanti played for first division clubs such as Newell's Old Boys and Argentinos Juniors in his native Argentina, as well as other lower division clubs including San Martín de San Juan, Independiente Rivadavia, Talleres de Córdoba, Unión de Villa Krause and Deportivo Maipú. He also played abroad for Bolivian club Blooming in two periods, Cobreloa in Chile, Hapoel Nazareth Illit from Israel, Monarcas Morelia in Mexico, Espoli of Ecuador and recently with NK CM Celje in Slovenia.

Honours

Club
Cobreloa
 Primera División de Chile (3): 2003 Apertura, 2003 Clausura

Blooming
 Primera Division de Bolivia (1): 2005 Apertura

References

External links
  Lisandro Sacripanti - Argentine Primera statistics at Fútbol XXI  
 Lisandro Sacripanti at BDFA.com.ar 
 

1982 births
Living people
Footballers from Rosario, Santa Fe
Argentine footballers
Association football forwards
Argentine Primera División players
Newell's Old Boys footballers
Argentinos Juniors footballers
Hapoel Nof HaGalil F.C. players
Talleres de Córdoba footballers
Club Blooming players
Cobreloa footballers
C.D. ESPOLI footballers
NK Celje players
San Martín de San Juan footballers
Slovenian PrvaLiga players
Independiente Rivadavia footballers
Atlético Morelia players
Argentine expatriate sportspeople in Israel
Argentine expatriate sportspeople in Bolivia
Argentine expatriate sportspeople in Chile
Argentine expatriate sportspeople in Ecuador
Argentine expatriate sportspeople in Slovenia
Expatriate footballers in Israel
Expatriate footballers in Bolivia
Expatriate footballers in Chile
Expatriate footballers in Ecuador
Expatriate footballers in Slovenia
Argentine expatriate footballers